{{Speciesbox
| name = Petrale sole
| image = Eopsetta jordani.jpg
| status = LC
| status_system = IUCN3.1
| status_ref =<ref name='IUCN'>{{cite iucn | author1 = Munroe, T.A. | author2 = Nielsen, J.G. | name-list-style = amp | year = 2010 | title = Eopsetta jordani' |errata=2017 | volume = 2010 | page = e.T154977A115257117 | doi = 10.2305/IUCN.UK.2010-4.RLTS.T154977A4681677.en |access-date=26 March 2018}}</ref>
| taxon = Eopsetta jordani
| authority = (Lockington, 1878)
| synonyms = Hippoglossoides jordani Lockington, 1879 
}}

The Petrale sole (Eopsetta jordani'') is an edible flatfish of the family Pleuronectidae. Its native habitat is the Eastern Pacific, stretching from the coast of Baja California in the south to the Aleutian Islands in the Bering Sea in the north.

Petrale sole is an important commercial fish, caught all along the West Coast of the United States and Canada and into the Bering Sea, almost exclusively by trawler.

Identification

Petrale sole is a right-eyed flounder with an oval body. Its upper surface is uniformly light to dark brown, and its lower surface is white, sometimes with pink traces. It has a large mouth with two rows of small, arrow-shaped teeth on the upper jaw and one row of teeth on the lower jaw.

Diet

Juvenile petrale sole feed on cumaceans, carideans and amphipods, whilst adults will eat shrimps, crabs, epibenthos organisms and other fish, such as herring, hake, anchovy, pollock and other flatfish.

Commercial fishing

The Petrale sole is an important commercial fish, and has been fished off Oregon since at least 1884. One fishery exists, off the west coast of the United States. Although Petrale sole are native to Alaska and are caught there and in other fisheries, no other designated Petrale sole fishery exists.

Between 1995 and 2004 the coastwide catch of Petrale sole ranged from 1,616 to 2,377 tonnes. The Pacific Fishery Management Council has established Acceptable Biological Catch limits for the annual harvests of petrale sole in the waters off the US west coast; from 1995 to 2000 the coastwide total annual catch did not exceed the catch limit, but from 2001 the catch in the Northern assessment area has exceeded the portion of the catch limit attributed to that area.

The estimated biomass of petrale sole in the northern segment of the fishery reached a historical low of 1,267 tonnes in 1992, but has increased steadily since then to 4,960 tonnes in 2005. The southern segment reached a historical low of 1,012 tonnes in 1986, and, after remaining stable for ten years, by 2005 it had increased to 4,667 tonnes. Petrale sole was declared overfished in 2009 and then rebuilt in 2015 after a period of reduced catches.

References

Petrale sole
Western North American coastal fauna
Taxa named by William Neale Lockington
Petrale sole